La Campagne Tropicana is a private 60-acre beach resort in Lekki, Lagos. La Campagne Tropicana Beach Resort combines an African themed hospitality with modern luxury. The beach resort has been patronized by world class dignitaries including ex-presidents, ministers and monarchs. La Campagne is regarded as one of the best beach resorts in Nigeria.

References

External links

Beaches of Lagos
Seaside resorts in Nigeria